Correa lawrenceana, commonly known as mountain correa, is a species of shrub or small tree of the family Rutaceae and is endemic to Australia. It has elliptical to egg-shaped leaves arranged in opposite pairs and cylindrical, greenish yellow to red flowers usually arranged singly or in groups of up to seven in leaf axils with the stamens protruding beyond the end of the corolla.

Description
The stamens project well beyond the end of the corolla. Flowering occurs in spring and sporadically at other times.

Taxonomy
This species was first described in 1834 by English botanist William Jackson Hooker who gave it the name Correa lawrenciana and published the description in his journal, The Journal of Botany. The specific epithet honours Tasmanian botanist Robert William Lawrence (1807-1833) who, together with Ronald Gunn, collected the plant material sent to Hooker. In 1998, Paul Wilson corrected the name to Correa lawrenceana to conform to the Tokyo Code.

A subgenus of Correa (Correa subgenus Persistens Othman, Duretto and G.J. Jord.) was formally described in 2011 comprising two species, C. lawrenceana and C. baeuerlenii. Unlike other Correa species, C. lawrenceana does not readily form hybrids with other species.

The names of eight varieties are accepted at the Australian Plant Census:
 Correa lawrenceana var. grampiana Paul G.Wilson, commonly known as Grampians mountain-correa, has leathery, broadly elliptical leaves, a calyx covered with woolly rust-coloured hairs and a cylindrical corolla covered with velvety hairs.

Some varieties grade into each other, and the delineation between them is imprecise.

Distribution and habitat
The species is found in  rainforest and sclerophyll forest in Tasmania, Victoria, New South Wales,  the Australian Capital Territory and Queensland. Variety cordifolia grows in forest on the coast and tablelands of southern New South Wales, the Australian Capital Territory and far north-eastern Victoria. Variety genoensis is only known from the banks of the Genoa River near the New South Wales - Victoria border. Variety glandulifera is found in the mountains from the Gibraltar Range in New South Wales to the McPherson Range in south-eastern Queensland. Variety grampiana grows among rocks in mountain areas, mainly in the Grampians. Variety latrobeana is found in south-eastern New South Wales and eastern Victoria. Variety lawrenceana occurs in mountainous areas in Tasmania and the Australian Capital Territory, var. macrocalyx is found in mountainous areas between the Taree and the Illawarra regions in New South Wales and var. rosea is only found in the Snowy Mountains of New South Wales.

Ecology
The flowers are presumed to be pollinated by either birds or bees.

Use in horticulture
Correa lawrenceana is suited to a cool, moist, partly shaded position and is known to tolerate frost and snow.  It can be used as a screening plant and will attract honeyeaters to the garden.
Plants are easily propagated from cuttings, whereas seed can be difficult.

References

lawrenceana
Flora of New South Wales
Flora of the Australian Capital Territory
Flora of Queensland
Flora of Tasmania
Flora of Victoria (Australia)
Plants described in 1834
Taxa named by William Jackson Hooker